VNV Nation is an Irish alternative electronic project led by Ronan Harris in the roles of singer, songwriter, and producer. VNV Nation's sound combines lyrics with sounds that ranges from melodic industrial dance anthems, to haunting ballads and post-classical soundtrack pieces. Their 2015 album Resonance: Music For Orchestra Vol. 1 achieved #4 Classical  & #3 Classical Crossover Billboard chart positions in the US. The "VNV" in the name stands for "Victory Not Vengeance," in keeping with the group's motto, "One should strive to achieve, not sit in bitter regret."

History

Prelude and formation
Ronan Harris was born and raised in Dublin, Ireland, where he was exposed to electronic music via radio programmes from which he developed an interest in bands such as Kraftwerk, DAF, and The Human League. In 1983, he joined a band named Die Fabrik, whose punk-inspired noise and synth style was not well received in Dublin. By 1987, Harris moved to London where, in 1989, he began to compose music under the name Nation - a 1984-inspired, electronic orchestral music project. Harris relocated to Toronto, Canada in 1990, but his music output stagnated until 1994 when he revived Nation, modified by his newfound motto: "Victory Not Vengeance" to become VNV Nation.

Early years: Advance and Follow (1995) and Praise the Fallen (1998)
The group's first release, Advance and Follow, came out in 1995. Advance And Follow featured industrial electronic beats heavily influenced by middle-era EBM acts such as Nitzer Ebb and Front 242, along a mixture of danceable synthesizer melodies, and elements of orchestral music. Although it was the band's first full-length release, Harris regards Advance and Follow more as a set of demos than a proper album. In 2001, it was re-released as Advance and Follow 2.0, with updated production, re-recorded vocals, and five bonus tracks, which include two Front 242 covers.

Their next release, Praise the Fallen in 1998, continued largely in this vein, and they began to enjoy a larger degree of commercial success.

During that time, Harris also wrote for the online magazine Side-Line, of which he was the webmaster until 1999.

Empires (1999)
Empires, released in 1999, was their breakthrough album, gaining them widespread commercial success and topping the German DAC charts for seven weeks. Empires expanded on the band's bombastic, melodic synthesizer lines and incorporated tighter song structures. Furthermore, the harsher 'sheet metal instrumentals' of Praise the Fallen were largely gone, and the music as a whole was far more complex with multiple-layered arpeggios and pads. The album was composed using a mix of analog and digital synthesizers, and an Ensoniq ASR-10 sampler. Notable analog synthesizers used on the album included the ARP 2600, which was used for most of the sounds on the tracks "Firstlight," "Arclight," and "Standing," the SCI Pro One, and an Oberheim OB-1. Digital synthesizers used were the Roland JP-8000, Access Virus (used almost exclusively on the track Darkangel), Korg Trinity, the EMU Proteus 2000 and the Roland JV-1080.

Futureperfect (2002)
Their 2002 album, Futureperfect, while retaining many industrial elements represented a departure in many ways, largely away from EBM and towards trance and synthpop. Some neoclassical instrumental pieces were included in the album. Around this time Ronan Harris and Apoptygma Berzerk's Stefan Groth were credited with coining the term "futurepop" to describe their sound. This shift caused their mainstream popularity to increase still further, but alienated some of their fans who preferred their earlier harsher and darker sound. Notably, the album was produced using only software synthesizers instead of hardware synthesizers. It was the first VNV Nation album made entirely with software synthesizers.

The band embarked on a highly successful world tour in support of Futureperfect from 2001 to 2003. Their concerts in Berlin, Washington DC, and the M'era Luna Festival were recorded and edited together for release as the Pastperfect DVD.
At this time VNV Nation consisted of Ronan Harris and drummer Mark Jackson.

Matter + Form (2005)
Their 2005 album, Matter + Form, expanded on the soundscape established with Futureperfect. Notable for this harder-edged sound was the first single "Chrome". Also of note is the lack of effects applied to the vocals, a departure from previous albums, which allows Harris' voice more space in the mix. There were also several songs with a softer and more pensive theme. Some songs even had a slight "rock" feeling to them, mostly from how drum sequences and bass lines were arranged, the most obvious example being the final song, "Perpetual". The assortment of instruments used in the production was much larger than on previous albums. While mostly composed using software synthesizers, several different analogue modular synthesizers were used, along with an array of vintage effects. This album was also the first time the band used an outside producer. Both Matter + Form and "Chrome" peaked at #1 on the DAC Albums and Singles charts, respectively.

Judgement (2007)
VNV Nation's next studio album was Judgement, released on 4 April 2007. Containing ten tracks, it continued the evolution of the VNV Nation sound. While written and recorded in VNV Nation's own studio, located in the now defunct Soundfactory Studios in Hamburg, the album production took advantage of the main studio's facilities through the use of its collection of vintage microphones and effects, and mixing the album on the studio's ADT console.

On 25 April 2007, at the sold-out show at The Metro in Chicago, Harris stated that the rumours about Judgement being the last album were false and that more was to come and that Judgement was just the beginning.

At the alternative electronic music festival Infest in Bradford on 26 August 2007, just after the murder of Sophie Lancaster, Harris dedicated the song "Illusion" to her and contacted the family soon afterwards to offer his condolences.

Reformation 1 (2009)
Two years after Judgement, the box set Reformation 1 was released in Europe on 24 April 2009. Its US release was on 12 May.

Of Faith, Power and Glory (2009)
The next album, Of Faith, Power and Glory was mentioned on the band's MySpace blog. Harris confirmed to Side-Line that they were aiming for late April to release the album, which would be titled Of Faith, Power and Glory, or as Harris described it: "The 3 things that people desire and which can make you or destroy you!"

Due to the release of "Reformation 1" in mid-April, the release of the album was postponed; it appeared in the US on CD and in the iTunes Store on 23 June 2009, and in Europe on 19 June 2009.

Crossing the Divide and Automatic (2010–2011)
A remix collection called Crossing The Divide was planned for release on 8 June 2010, but was delayed until May 2012. The update on the official website cited unforeseen circumstances and personal matters for the delay. On 14 May 2012, the EP was announced on the band's Facebook page and made available for free via SoundCloud. There were also plans for a number of extended and enhanced re-releases of previous albums in 2010; however these plans did not materialize.

On 16 September 2011, VNV Nation's eighth studio album Automatic, was released for most of Europe, with the physical CD released on 25 October 2011 in the United States.

Gothic meets Klassik, Transnational, and Resonance (2012–15) 
In November 2012, VNV Nation, Blutengel and Staubkind performed at the Gothic meets Klassik festival in Leipzig. On the 10th, they played a standard electronic set, and on the 11th, they performed with Ronan Harris on vocals accompanied by a full symphony orchestra for the first time. That orchestra was the Gewandhausorchester, one of the most traditional German orchestras, which had already premiered works by Ludwig van Beethoven or Franz Schubert. The show was recorded for release, but a problem with the recording equipment rendered the audio unusable. As a result, Ronan began to work with the arranger on an album of VNV Nation songs scored for orchestra, which would include the tracks performed at Gothic Meets Klassik as well as additional songs. Ronan also performed a selection of VNV Nation songs with a classical pianist on the 2013 Gothic Cruise.

The new album Transnational was released on 11 October (EU), 15 October (NA), and elsewhere on 19 November, preceded by a promotional tour beginning on 2 October 2013.

The orchestral album Resonance: Music For Orchestra Vol. 1 was released on 15 May 2015. It consists of tracks selected from their back catalogue reimagined for orchestra. It was recorded in the Babelsberg Studios outside Berlin at the end of February 2015, the same studios where scores for films such as The Hunger Games: Mockingjay – Part 1 and Part 2 were recorded. The songs "Nova (Largo)" and "Teleconnect, Part 2" were recorded with a piano and string trio ensemble. The album was too long for a single vinyl record, and was released as a limited edition 6 x 10" vinyl box set in addition to standard CD digipack and digital formats. Resonance reached #7 on the official German Album Charts the week of 22 May 2015, and respectively #3 on the US Billboard Classical Crossover Album Charts and #4 on the US Billboard Classical Music Charts for 30 May 2015.

Noire (2018) 
On 16 November 2017 in was announced that Mark Jackson, who had participated as live drummer at concerts since the mid-1990s, had left VNV Nation.

Their tenth studio album, Noire, was released on 12 October 2018 as a digital album in all markets, and as a physical CD in non-American markets via Anachron Records. In the American market, the physical CD was distributed by Metropolis Records, with an expected release date of 9 November 2018.

Electric Sun (2023) 
On 26 April 2022, VNV Nation's eleventh studio album, Electric Sun was announced with an April 2023 album release to coincide with a February 2023 European Tour.

On 19 February 2023, VNV Nation released "Before the Rain" the first single from Electric Sun.

Discography

Advance and Follow (1995)
Praise the Fallen (1998)
Empires (1999)
Futureperfect (2002)
Matter + Form (2005)
Judgement (2007)
Of Faith, Power and Glory (2009)
Automatic (2011)
Transnational (2013)
Resonance: Music For Orchestra Vol. 1 (2015)
Noire (2018)

References

External links

 Official VNV Nation website
 Ronan interview with Strangeways Radio – 5 March 2012
Dieselpunks.org Interview  – 19 June 2009
Side-Line Magazine Interview – 2005
 VNV Nation at Discogs
 VNV Nation at Last.fm
 
 Interview with DJ Starr – 2006
 VNV Nation Gallery on Alberta Stars – 2007

Irish electronic music groups
Musical groups from London
TVT Records artists
Musical groups established in 1990
English electronic music groups
Wax Trax! Records artists
Metropolis Records artists
Dependent Records artists
Off Beat label artists